Sheshatshiu is an Innu federal reserve and designated place in the Canadian province of Newfoundland and Labrador. Some references may spell the community's name as Sheshatshit, the t spelling is more traditional in the Innu-aimun language, but the u is used more commonly in English to avoid inappropriate connotations. The name means "a narrow place in the river".

The community is inhabited by the Sheshatshiu Innu First Nation, whose current chief is Eugene Hart.

History

In 1836 the Hudson's Bay Company established a trading post at North West River and the traders provided the Innu with European tools.

During the First World War, some Innu from Sheshatshiu fought overseas in the Royal Newfoundland Regiment. In 1915 the International Grenfell Association established a hospital in North West River to serve the European settlers and indigenous people of the region. This hospital was closed in 1983 and residents of Sheshatshiu and North West River now rely on Happy Valley-Goose Bay for medical services.

In 1946 elections were held to send delegates to the Newfoundland National Convention. This was the first time an election was held in Labrador. Lester Burry was elected to the convention and he supported future premier Joey Smallwood and his proposal of confederation with Canada.

In 1949 when Newfoundland and Labrador joined Canada the Indian Act did not include the First Nations of the province. This was done to preserve their right to vote however it also prevented the Innu from protecting their land and culture.

The Innu of Labrador settled into permanent villages in the 1960s and were one of the last Aboriginal groups in Canada to do so. Previously, Sheshatshiu had only been used by the Innu as a coastal settlement and for trading with Europeans.

In the 1980s and 1990s the community of Sheshatshiu, along with the Innu Nation, protested against NATO low-level tactical training flights which utilized CFB Goose Bay.

In 1997, Queen Elizabeth II visited Sheshatshiu and was presented with a letter by community leaders lamenting colonialization.

In November 2000, the community, along with Davis Inlet, took the unprecedented step of asking the Canadian federal government to step in and assist with a local addiction crisis. Due to a variety of factors, including economic adversity, alcoholism and gas sniffing were both rampant in the community, in some cases affecting children as young as five years old.

Labrador's Innu became status Indians under the Indian Act in 2002 and "Sheshatshiu 3" became a federal reserve in 2006.

In 2017, the Innu Nation stated that there are 165 Labrador Innu children in foster care, 80 of whom are placed outside their home communities of Sheshatshiu and Natuashish.

In October 2019, the Sheshatshiu Innu First Nation declared a suicide crisis after 10 suicide attempts were reported within the community in a matter of days.

As of 2020, according to Innu Nation Grand Chief Gregory Rich, Sheshatshiu and Natuashish have a collective population of about 3,000 with about half of that being youths. Of that 167 of them are in the care of the Manager of Child and Youth Services.

Geography 
Sheshatshiu is in Labrador within Division No. 10. It is adjacent to Inuit community of North West River. Sheshatshiu is connected to Happy Valley-Goose Bay by a 40 km paved road. The roads in Sheshatshiu and North West River are the most northern paved roads in Atlantic Canada. It is located roughly at the province's geographic centre.

Demographics 
The median age is 21.7 and over half of the population is below the age of 25. 96% of Sheshatshiu's residents are Innu. The community has notable minorities of Europeans and Inuit. The largest religion in the community is Catholicism. Most of Sheshatshiu's residents speak a dialect of the Cree language. English is commonly spoken in Sheshatshiu as well.

Notable people 
David Penashue, rock singer.
Peter Penashue, former cabinet minister under Stephen Harper from 2011-13.

See also 
List of communities in Newfoundland and Labrador
List of designated places in Newfoundland and Labrador
List of Indian reserves in Canada
Mushuau Innu First Nation

References 

First Nations reserves in Newfoundland and Labrador
Innu communities in Newfoundland and Labrador
Designated places in Newfoundland and Labrador
Hudson's Bay Company trading posts
2000 in Canada
Political scandals in Canada
Populated coastal places in Canada
Health disasters in Canada
Indian reserves in Newfoundland and Labrador